Tuokkola is a Finnish surname. Notable people with the surname include:

Mirjam Tuokkola (born 1997), Finnish archer
Pekka Tuokkola (born 1983), Finnish ice hockey player
Tuomas Tuokkola (born 1970), Finnish ice hockey player and coach

Finnish-language surnames